The 1914 Maine gubernatorial election took place on September 14, 1914.

Incumbent Republican Governor William T. Haines was defeated for re-election by Democratic candidate Oakley C. Curtis.

Results

Notes

References

Gubernatorial
1914
Maine
September 1914 events